The 1903 U.S. Open was the ninth U.S. Open, held June 26–29 at Baltusrol Golf Club in Springfield, New Jersey, west of New York City. Willie Anderson won the second of his four U.S. Open titles in a playoff over David Brown. The championship was played on the original course at Baltusrol, now known as the Old Course, which no longer exists.

Anderson led after each of the first three rounds, with a six-shot lead after 54 holes, but carded 82 in the final round on Saturday afternoon. Brown's 76 equaled them at 307 total, eight strokes clear of the field. The playoff was moved to Monday because Sunday was reserved for member play, and was played in a heavy rainstorm. Anderson took a two-stroke lead at the turn, but Brown managed to tie after 14. At the next hole, Brown made a seven after his tee shot went out of bounds, but Anderson only gained  a single stroke after three-putting for a six. At 16, Brown made a six to Anderson's five, and both made fours on the last two holes; Anderson ended at 82, two shots ahead.

Anderson had won in 1901 and was the first to win the U.S. Open twice; it was the first of three consecutive titles, a feat yet to be repeated. His four U.S. Open wins set a record which has been equaled by three others: Bobby Jones, Ben Hogan, and Jack Nicklaus.

Donald Ross, who would become known as one of the greatest golf course architects, designing several courses that hosted future U.S. Opens, had his best U.S. Open finish with a 5th place showing. Baseball Hall of Famer John Montgomery Ward played in his first of two U.S. Opens here, finishing in 56th place.

The Old Course at Baltusrol hosted the U.S. Open again a dozen years later in 1915, then was plowed under three years later in 1918 by course architect A. W. Tillinghast to create the Upper and Lower Courses.

Past champions in the field 

Source:

Did not play: Harry Vardon (1900), Fred Herd (1898), James Foulis (1896).

Round summaries

First round
Friday, June 26, 1903 (morning)

Source:

Second round
Friday, June 26, 1903 (afternoon)

Source:

Third round
Saturday, June 27, 1903 (morning)

Source:

Final round
Saturday, June 27, 1903 (afternoon)

Source:

Amateurs: Douglas (322), Reinhart (325), Travis (326), Brokaw (333),Croker (348), Carnegie (353), Kellogg (356), Gillespie (357),Tappin (359), Watson (360), Ward (363), McDonald (372).

Playoff
Monday, June 29, 1903

Source:

References

External links
USGA Championship Database

U.S. Open (golf)
Golf in New Jersey
Springfield Township, Union County, New Jersey
U.S. Open (golf)
U.S. Open (golf)
U.S. Open
U.S. Open (golf)